Bohal is a commune in the Morbihan department of Brittany in northwestern France.

Population
Inhabitants of Bohal are called in French Bohalais.

See also
Communes of the Morbihan department

References

External links
Mayors of Morbihan Association 

Communes of Morbihan